The Ile du Nord, part of the Maria Island Group, is a small granite island with an area of approximately  lying close to the eastern coast of Tasmania, Australia, near the Freycinet Peninsula.

It is close to the northernmost point of Maria Island and is part of the Maria Island National Park.

Fauna
Recorded breeding seabird species are little penguin and short-tailed shearwater.  The metallic skink is present. Rakali have also been seen on the island.

See also

Protected areas of Tasmania
List of islands of Tasmania

References

Islands of South East Tasmania
Protected areas of Tasmania
East Coast Tasmania